John Jardine was the  speaker of 19th Legislative Assembly of Prince Edward Island in 1854.

References

Speakers of the Legislative Assembly of Prince Edward Island
Members of the Legislative Council of Prince Edward Island
19th-century Canadian politicians
Year of birth uncertain
Year of death uncertain
Colony of Prince Edward Island people